The Chilean National History Award (Spanish: Premio Nacional de Historia), part of the National Prize of Chile, is an award given for contributions to the historiography of Chilean history. It was first awarded in 1974, is given every two years, and includes a sum of 13,186,565 Chilean pesos plus a pension of 20 Unidad Tributaria Mensual.

Award winners 
Source: National Library of Chile

See also

 List of history awards

References

Historiography of Chile
Chilean awards
Awards established in 1974
History awards
1974 establishments in Chile